Dedić, also spelled Dedic, Dedič, Dědič or Dedich is a surname of Slavic origin, which is a common surname in most of the South Slav nations, but it is also found in the United States, Austria, Germany and Switzerland. The first record of the surname Dedić dates back to 1569 where it was recorded in the "Book of the Baptized of the city of Rab", thus belonging to the group of the oldest surnames in the city of Rab, Croatia. The meaning of the surname is successor, duke, or tribal leader. 

People with the surname Dedić:

A 
Amar Dedić (born 2002), Bosnian footballer
Amira Medunjanin née Dedić (born 1972), Bosnian singer
Anel Dedić (born 1991), Bosnian footballer
Arnel Dedić (born 1976), Croatian basketball player
 Arsen Dedić (1938-2015), Croatian singer-songwriter
F
 Faruk Dedić (born 1971), Bosnian football manager

J
 Josef Dědič (1924-1992), Czechoslovak figure skater and sport official

N
 Nenad Dedić (born 1990), Croatian footballer who plays for Zavrč in the Slovenian PrvaLiga

M
  – Croatian jazz pianist and composer
  – Serbian academic painter
 Mirela Dedic (born 1991), Austrian handballer who plays for the national team
 Mirsad Dedić (born 1968), Bosnian footballer

R
 René Dedič (born 1993), Slovak footballer
 Rusmin Dedić (born 1982), former Slovenian footballer who played as a defender

S
 Slavko Dedić (born 1979), Montenegrin chess player

W
  - former German football player

Z
 Zlatko Dedič (born 1984), Slovenian football forward who currently plays for the Slovenia national football team.

References

Bosnian surnames
Serbian surnames
Croatian surnames